Kerrick is an unincorporated community in Dallam County, Texas, United States.

History

First settled in 1906, the community lies in the extreme northeastern part of the county near the Oklahoma state line. It is named after Harrison S. Kerrick, a railroad official and colonel in the United States Army, who owned land in the vicinity. The town's post office was established in 1933, and is still in operation.

During World War II, Kerrick had the only designated airport between Amarillo and Denver, Colorado.

References

External links
Handbook of Texas Online
Texas Escapes

Unincorporated communities in Texas
Unincorporated communities in Dallam County, Texas